The Arab Spring was a series of anti-government protests, uprisings and armed rebellions that spread across much of the Arab world in the early 2010s. It began in Tunisia in response to corruption and economic stagnation. From Tunisia, the protests then spread to five other countries: Libya, Egypt, Yemen, Syria and Bahrain. Rulers were deposed (Zine El Abidine Ben Ali, Muammar Gaddafi, Hosni Mubarak, Ali Abdullah Saleh) or major uprisings and social violence occurred including riots, civil wars, or insurgencies. Sustained street demonstrations took place in Morocco, Iraq, Algeria, Lebanon, Jordan, Kuwait, Oman and Sudan. Minor protests took place in Djibouti, Mauritania, Palestine, Saudi Arabia and the Moroccan-occupied Western Sahara. A major slogan of the demonstrators in the Arab world is ash-shaʻb yurīd isqāṭ an-niẓām!.

The wave of initial revolutions and protests faded by mid-2012, as many Arab Spring demonstrations were met with violent responses from authorities, as well as from pro-government militias, counter-demonstrators, and militaries. These attacks were answered with violence from protesters in some cases. Large-scale conflicts resulted: the Syrian Civil War; the rise of ISIL, insurgency in Iraq and the following civil war; the Egyptian Crisis, coup, and subsequent unrest and insurgency; the Libyan Civil War; and the Yemeni Crisis and following civil war. Regimes that lacked major oil wealth and hereditary succession arrangements were more likely to undergo regime change.

A power struggle continued after the immediate response to the Arab Spring. While leadership changed and regimes were held accountable, power vacuums opened across the Arab world. Ultimately, it resulted in a contentious battle between a consolidation of power by religious elites and the growing support for democracy in many Muslim-majority states. The early hopes that these popular movements would end corruption, increase political participation, and bring about greater economic equity quickly collapsed in the wake of the counter-revolutionary moves by foreign state actors in Yemen, the regional and international military interventions in Bahrain and Yemen, and the destructive civil wars in Syria, Iraq, Libya, and Yemen.

Some have referred to the succeeding and still ongoing conflicts as the Arab Winter. As of May 2018, only the uprising in Tunisia has resulted in a transition to constitutional democratic governance. Recent uprisings in Sudan and Algeria show that the conditions that started the Arab Spring have not faded and political movements against authoritarianism and exploitation are still occurring. In 2019, multiple uprisings and protest movements in Algeria, Sudan, Iraq, Lebanon, and Egypt have been seen as a continuation of the Arab Spring.

, multiple conflicts are still continuing that might be seen as a result of the Arab Spring. The Syrian Civil War has caused massive political instability and economic hardship in Syria, with the Syrian pound plunging to new lows. In Libya, a major civil war recently concluded, with Western powers and Russia sending in proxy fighters. In Yemen, a civil war continues to affect the country. In Lebanon, a major banking crisis is threatening the country's economy as well as that of neighboring Syria.

Etymology 
The term Arab Spring is an allusion to the Revolutions of 1848, which are sometimes referred to as the "Springtime of Nations", and the Prague Spring in 1968, in which a Czech student, Jan Palach, set himself on fire as Mohamed Bouazizi did. In the aftermath of the Iraq War, it was used by various commentators and bloggers who anticipated a major Arab movement towards democratization. The first specific use of the term Arab Spring as used to denote these events may have started with the US political journal Foreign Policy. Political scientist Marc Lynch described Arab Spring as "a term I may have unintentionally coined in a 6 January 2011 article" for Foreign Policy magazine. Joseph Massad on Al Jazeera said the term was "part of a US strategy of controlling the movement's aims and goals" and directing it towards Western-style liberal democracy. When Arab Spring protests in some countries were followed by electoral success for Islamist parties, some American pundits coined the terms Islamist Spring and Islamist Winter.

Some observers have also drawn comparisons between the Arab Spring movements and the Revolutions of 1989 (also known as the "Autumn of Nations") that swept through Eastern Europe and the Second World, in terms of their scale and significance. Others, however, have pointed out that there are several key differences between the movements, such as the desired outcomes, the effectiveness of civil resistance, and the organizational role of Internet-based technologies in the Arab revolutions.

Causes

Pressures from within 
The world watched the events of the Arab Spring unfold, "gripped by the narrative of a young generation peacefully rising up against oppressive authoritarianism to secure a more democratic political system and a brighter economic future". The Arab Spring is widely believed to have been instigated by dissatisfaction, particularly of youth and unions, with the rule of local governments, though some have speculated that wide gaps in income levels and pressures caused by the Great Recession may have had a hand as well. Some activists had taken part in programs sponsored by the US-funded National Endowment for Democracy, but the US government claimed that they did not initiate the uprisings.

Numerous factors led to the protests, including issues such as reform, human rights violations, political corruption, economic decline, unemployment, extreme poverty, and a number of demographic structural factors, such as a large percentage of educated but dissatisfied youth within the entire population. Catalysts for the revolts in all Northern African and Persian Gulf countries included the concentration of wealth in the hands of monarchs in power for decades, insufficient transparency of its redistribution, corruption, and especially the refusal of the youth to accept the status quo.

Some protesters looked to the Turkish model as an ideal (contested but peaceful elections, fast-growing but liberal economy, secular constitution but Islamist government). Other analysts blamed the rise in food prices on commodity traders and the conversion of crops to ethanol. Yet others have claimed that the context of high rates of unemployment and corrupt political regimes led to dissent movements within the region.

Social media 

In the wake of the Arab Spring protests, a considerable amount of attention focused on the role of social media and digital technologies in allowing citizens within areas affected by "the Arab Uprisings" as a means for collective activism to circumvent state-operated media channels. The influence of social media on political activism during the Arab Spring has, however, been much debated. Protests took place both in states with a very high level of Internet usage (such as Bahrain with 88% of its population online in 2011) and in states with some of the lowest Internet penetration (Yemen and Libya).

The use of social media platforms more than doubled in Arab countries during the protests, with the exception of Libya. Some researchers have shown how collective intelligence, dynamics of the crowd in participatory systems such as social media, has immense power to support a collective action—such as foment a political change. , the number of Facebook users in the Arab world surpassed 27.7 million people. Some critics have argued that digital technologies and other forms of communication—videos, cellular phones, blogs, photos, emails, and text messages—have brought about the concept of a "digital democracy" in parts of North Africa affected by the uprisings.

Facebook, Twitter, and other major social media played a key role in the movement of Egyptian and Tunisian activists in particular. Nine out of ten Egyptians and Tunisians responded to a poll that they used Facebook to organize protests and spread awareness. This large population of young Egyptian men referred to themselves as "the Facebook generation", exemplifying their escape from their non-modernized past. Furthermore, 28% of Egyptians and 29% of Tunisians from the same poll said that blocking Facebook greatly hindered and/or disrupted communication. Social media sites were a platform for different movements formed by many frustrated citizens, including the 2008 "April 6 Youth Movement" organized by Ahmed Mahed, which set out to organize and promote a nationwide labor strike and which inspired the later creation of the "Progressive Youth of Tunisia".

During the Arab Spring, people created pages on Facebook to raise awareness about alleged crimes against humanity, such as police brutality in the Egyptian Revolution (see Wael Ghonim and Death of Khaled Mohamed Saeed). Whether the project of raising awareness was primarily pursued by Arabs themselves or simply advertised by Western social media users is a matter of debate. Jared Keller, a journalist for The Atlantic, claims that most activists and protesters used Facebook (among other social media) to organize; however, what influenced Iran was "good old-fashioned word of mouth". Jared Keller argued that the sudden and anomalous social media output was caused from Westerners witnessing the situation(s), and then broadcasting them. The Middle East and North Africa used texting, emailing, and blogging only to organize and communicate information about internal local protests.

A study by Zeynep Tufekci of the University of North Carolina and Christopher Wilson of the United Nations Development Program concluded that "social media in general, and Facebook in particular, provided new sources of information the regime could not easily control and were crucial in shaping how citizens made individual decisions about participating in protests, the logistics of protest, and the likelihood of success." Marc Lynch of George Washington University said, "while social media boosters envisioned the creation of a new public sphere based on dialogue and mutual respect, the reality is that Islamists and their adversaries retreat to their respective camps, reinforcing each other's prejudices while throwing the occasional rhetorical bomb across the no-man's land that the center has become." Lynch also stated in a Foreign Policy article, "There is something very different about scrolling through pictures and videos of unified, chanting Yemeni or Egyptian crowds demanding democratic change and waking up to a gory image of a headless 6-year-old girl on your Facebook news feed."

In the months leading up to events in Tunisia, Department of Homeland Security, Customs and Border Protection, Communications Program Manager Jonathan Stevens predicted the use of "collaborative Internet utilities" to effect governmental change. In his thesis, Webeaucracy: The Collaborative Revolution, Stevens put forth that unlike writing, printing, and telecommunications, "collaborative Internet utilities" denote a sea-change in the ability of crowds to effect social change. People and collaborative Internet utilities can be described as actor-networks; the subitizing limit (and history) suggests people left to their own devices cannot fully harness the mental power of crowds. Metcalfe's law suggests that as the number of nodes increases, the value of collaborative actor-networks increases quadratically; collaborative Internet utilities effectively increase the subitizing limit, and, at some macro scale, these interactive collaborative actor-networks can be described by the same rules that govern Parallel Distributed Processing, resulting in crowd sourcing that acts as a type of distributed collective consciousness. The Internet assumes the role of earlier totemic religious figureheads, uniting the members of society through mechanical solidarity forming a collective consciousness. Through many-to-many collaborative Internet utilities, the Webeaucracy is empowered as never before.

Social networks were not the only instrument for rebels to coordinate their efforts and communicate. In the countries with the lowest Internet penetration and the limited role of social networks, such as Yemen and Libya, the role of mainstream electronic media devices—cellular phones, emails, and video clips (e.g., YouTube)—was very important to cast the light on the situation in the country and spread the word about the protests in the outside world. In Egypt, in Cairo particularly, mosques were one of the main platforms to coordinate the protest actions and raise awareness to the masses.

Conversely, scholarship literature on the Middle East, political scientist Gregory Gause has found, had failed to predict the events of the Arab uprisings. Commenting on an early article by Gause whose review of a decade of Middle Eastern studies led him to conclude that almost no scholar foresaw what was coming, Chair of Ottoman and Turkish Studies at Tel Aviv University Ehud R. Toledano writes that Gause's finding is "a strong and sincere mea culpa" and that his criticism of Middle East experts for "underestimating the hidden forces driving change ... while they worked instead to explain the unshakable stability of repressive authoritarian regimes" is well-placed. Toledano then quotes Gause saying, "As they wipe the egg off their faces," those experts "need to reconsider long-held assumptions about the Arab world."

Timeline

History

Events leading up to the Arab Spring 
Tunisia experienced a series of conflicts during the three years leading up to the Arab Spring, the most notable occurring in the mining area of Gafsa in 2008, where protests continued for many months. These protests included rallies, sit-ins, and strikes, during which there were two fatalities, an unspecified number of wounded, and dozens of arrests.

In Egypt, the labor movement had been strong for years, with more than 3,000 labor actions since 2004, and provided an important venue for organizing protests and collective action. One important demonstration was an attempted workers' strike on 6 April 2008 at the state-run textile factories of al-Mahalla al-Kubra, just outside Cairo. The idea for this type of demonstration spread throughout the country, promoted by computer-literate working-class youths and their supporters among middle-class college students. A Facebook page, set up to promote the strike, attracted tens of thousands of followers and provided the platform for sustained political action in pursuit of the "long revolution". The government mobilized to break the strike through infiltration and riot police, and while the regime was somewhat successful in forestalling a strike, dissidents formed the "6 April Committee" of youths and labor activists, which became one of the major forces calling for the anti-Mubarak demonstration on 25 January in Tahrir Square.

In Algeria, discontent had been building for years over a number of issues. In February 2008, US Ambassador Robert Ford wrote in a leaked diplomatic cable that Algeria is "unhappy" with long-standing political alienation; that social discontent persisted throughout the country, with food strikes occurring almost every week; that there were demonstrations every day somewhere in the country; and that the Algerian government was corrupt and fragile. Some claimed that during 2010 there were as many as "9,700 riots and unrests" throughout the country. Many protests focused on issues such as education and health care, while others cited rampant corruption.

Their intention was to demonstrate against labor discrimination, unemployment, looting of resources, and human rights abuses. The camp contained between 12,000 and 20,000 inhabitants, but on 8 November 2010 it was destroyed and its inhabitants evicted by Moroccan security forces. The security forces faced strong opposition from some young Sahrawi civilians, and rioting soon spread to El Aaiún and other towns within the territory, resulting in an unknown number of injuries and deaths. Violence against Sahrawis in the aftermath of the protests was cited as a reason for renewed protests months later, after the start of the Arab Spring.

The catalyst for the escalation of protests was the self-immolation of Tunisian Mohamed Bouazizi. Unable to find work and selling fruit at a roadside stand, Bouazizi had his wares confiscated by a municipal inspector on 17 December 2010. An hour later he doused himself with gasoline and set himself afire. His death on 4 January 2011 brought together various groups dissatisfied with the existing system, including many unemployed persons, political and human rights activists, labor and trade unionists, students, professors, lawyers, and others to begin the Tunisian Revolution.

Protests and uprisings 
The series of protests and demonstrations across the Middle East and North Africa that commenced in 2010 became known as the "Arab Spring", and sometimes as the "Arab Spring and Winter", "Arab Awakening", or "Arab Uprisings", even though not all the participants in the protests were Arab. It was sparked by the first protests that occurred in Tunisia on 18 December 2010 in Sidi Bouzid, following Mohamed Bouazizi's self-immolation in protest of police corruption and ill treatment. With the success of the protests in Tunisia, a wave of unrest sparked by the Tunisian "Burning Man" struck Algeria, Jordan, Egypt, and Yemen, then spread to other countries. The largest, most organized demonstrations often occurred on a "day of rage", usually Friday afternoon prayers. The protests also triggered similar unrest outside the region. Contrary to expectations the revolutions were not led by Islamists:

The Arab Spring caused the "biggest transformation of the Middle East since decolonization". By the end of February 2012, rulers had been forced from power in Tunisia, Egypt, Libya, and Yemen; civil uprisings had erupted in Bahrain and Syria; major protests had broken out in Algeria, Iraq, Jordan, Kuwait, Morocco, Oman, and Sudan; and minor protests had occurred in Mauritania, Saudi Arabia, Djibouti, Western Sahara, and Palestine. Tunisian President Zine El Abidine Ben Ali fled to Saudi Arabia on 14 January 2011 following the Tunisian Revolution protests. Egyptian President Hosni Mubarak resigned on 11 February 2011 after 18 days of massive protests, ending his 30-year presidency. The Libyan leader Muammar Gaddafi was overthrown on 23 August 2011, after the National Transitional Council (NTC) took control of Bab al-Azizia. He was killed on 20 October 2011 in his hometown of Sirte after the NTC took control of the city. Yemeni President Ali Abdullah Saleh signed the GCC power-transfer deal in which a presidential election was held, resulting in his successor Abdrabbuh Mansur Hadi formally replacing him as president on 27 February 2012 in exchange for immunity from prosecution. Weapons and Tuareg fighters returning from the Libyan Civil War stoked a simmering conflict in Mali that has been described as 'fallout' from the Arab Spring in North Africa.

During this period, several leaders announced their intentions to step down at the end of their current terms. Sudanese President Omar al-Bashir announced that he would not seek reelection in 2015 (he ultimately retracted his announcement and ran anyway), as did Iraqi Prime Minister Nouri al-Maliki, whose term was to end in 2014, although there were violent demonstrations demanding his immediate resignation in 2011. Protests in Jordan also caused the sacking of four successive governments by King Abdullah. The popular unrest in Kuwait also resulted in the resignation of Prime Minister Nasser Al-Sabah's cabinet.

The geopolitical implications of the protests drew global attention. Some protesters were nominated for the 2011 Nobel Peace Prize. Tawakkol Karman of Yemen was co-recipient of the 2011 Nobel Peace Prize due to her role organizing peaceful protests. In December 2011 Time magazine named "The Protester" its "Person of the Year". Spanish photographer Samuel Aranda won the 2011 World Press Photo award for his image of a Yemeni woman holding an injured family member, taken during the civil uprising in Yemen on 15 October 2011.

Summary of conflicts by country

Major events

Bahrain (2011) 

The protests in Bahrain started on 14 February, and were initially aimed at achieving greater political freedom and respect for human rights; they were not intended to directly threaten the monarchy. Lingering frustration among the Shiite majority with being ruled by the Sunni government was a major root cause, but the protests in Tunisia and Egypt are cited as the inspiration for the demonstrations. The protests were largely peaceful until a pre-dawn raid by police on 17 February to clear protestors from Pearl Roundabout in Manama, in which police killed four protesters. Following the raid, some protesters began to expand their aims to a call for the end of the monarchy. On 18 February, army forces opened fire on protesters when they tried to reenter the roundabout, fatally wounding one. The following day protesters reoccupied Pearl Roundabout after the government ordered troops and police to withdraw. Subsequent days saw large demonstrations; on 21 February a pro-government Gathering of National Unity drew tens of thousands, whilst on 22 February the number of protestors at the Pearl Roundabout peaked at over 150,000 after more than 100,000 protesters marched there and were coming under fire from the Bahraini Military which killed around 20 and injured over 100 protestors. On 14 March, GCC forces (composed mainly of Saudi and UAE troops) were requested by the government and occupied the country.

King Hamad bin Isa Al Khalifa declared a three-month state of emergency on 15 March and asked the military to reassert its control as clashes spread across the country. On 16 March, armed soldiers and riot police cleared the protesters' camp in the Pearl Roundabout, in which 3 policemen and 3 protesters were reportedly killed. Later, on 18 March, the government tore down Pearl Roundabout monument. After the lifting of emergency law on 1 June, several large rallies were staged by the opposition parties. Smaller-scale protests and clashes outside of the capital have continued to occur almost daily. On 9 March 2012, over 100,000 protested in what the opposition called "the biggest march in our history".

The police response has been described as a "brutal" crackdown on peaceful and unarmed protestors, including doctors and bloggers. The police carried out midnight house raids in Shia neighbourhoods, beatings at checkpoints, and denial of medical care in a "campaign of intimidation". More than 2,929 people have been arrested, and at least five people died due to torture while in police custody. On 23 November 2011, the Bahrain Independent Commission of Inquiry released its report on its investigation of the events, finding that the government had systematically tortured prisoners and committed other human rights violations. It also rejected the government's claims that the protests were instigated by Iran. Although the report found that systematic torture had stopped, the Bahraini government has refused entry to several international human rights groups and news organizations, and delayed a visit by a UN inspector. More than 80 people had died since the start of the uprising.

Even a decade after the 2011 uprisings, the situation in Bahrain remained unchanged. The regime continued suppression against all forms of dissent. Years after the demonstrations, the Bahraini authorities are known to have accelerated their crackdown. They have been targeting human rights defenders, journalists, Shiite political groups and social media critics.

Saudi Arabia
Saudi government forces quashed protests in the country and assisted Bahraini authorities in suppressing demonstrations there. 

Jamal Khashoggi a Saudi critic, covered the Arab spring and spoke out against the Saudi government during this time. He was murdered by the government a few years later.

Egypt (2011) 

Inspired by the uprising in Tunisia and prior to his entry as a central figure in Egyptian politics, potential presidential candidate Mohamed ElBaradei warned of a "Tunisia-style explosion" in Egypt.

Protests in Egypt began on 25 January 2011 and ran for 18 days. Beginning around midnight on 28 January, the Egyptian government attempted, somewhat successfully, to eliminate the nation's Internet access, in order to inhibit the protesters' ability to use media activism to organize through social media. Later that day, as tens of thousands protested on the streets of Egypt's major cities, President Hosni Mubarak dismissed his government, later appointing a new cabinet. Mubarak also appointed the first Vice President in almost 30 years.

The U.S. embassy and international students began a voluntary evacuation near the end of January, as violence and rumors of violence escalated.

On 10 February, Mubarak ceded all presidential power to Vice President Omar Suleiman, but soon thereafter announced that he would remain as president until the end of his term. However, protests continued the next day, and Suleiman quickly announced that Mubarak had resigned from the presidency and transferred power to the Armed Forces of Egypt. The military immediately dissolved the Egyptian Parliament, suspended the Constitution of Egypt, and promised to lift the nation's thirty-year "emergency laws". A civilian, Essam Sharaf, was appointed as Prime Minister of Egypt on 4 March to widespread approval among Egyptians in Tahrir Square. Violent protests, however, continued through the end of 2011 as many Egyptians expressed concern about the Supreme Council of the Armed Forces' perceived sluggishness in instituting reforms and their grip on power.

Hosni Mubarak and his former interior minister Habib el-Adly were sentenced to life in prison on the basis of their failure to stop the killings during the first six days of the 2011 Egyptian Revolution. His successor, Mohamed Morsi, was sworn in as Egypt's first democratically elected president before judges at the Supreme Constitutional Court. Fresh protests erupted in Egypt on 22 November 2012. On 3 July 2013, the military overthrew the replacement government and President Morsi was removed from power.

The aftermath of the uprising that took place in Egypt was deemed to turn out successfully. However, a December 2020 report published by PRI's The World, a US-based public radio news magazine, the Egyptian government increased its executions by more than twofold. As a result, the government put to death approximately 60 people. This included human rights activists of the Egyptian Initiative for Personal Rights (EIPR), who were arrested in November 2020. The executive director of the Project on Middle East Democracy, Stephen McInerney cited that a majority of pro-democracy activists have escaped Egypt and those who couldn't have gone in hiding. The Project on Middle East Democracy mentioned using encrypted communication channels to talk to the activists, concerning the protection of their whereabouts. Western countries have overlooked these issues including, the United States, France, and several other European countries. According to the founder of Tahrir Institute for Middle East Policy in Washington, DC, even after 10 years of the Arab spring, the country is at its lowest point for human rights.

Libya (2011) 

Anti-government protests began in Libya on 15 February 2011. By 18 February, the opposition controlled most of Benghazi, the country's second-largest city. The government dispatched elite troops and militia in an attempt to recapture it, but they were repelled. By 20 February, protests had spread to the capital Tripoli, leading to a television address by Saif al-Islam Gaddafi, who warned the protestors that their country could descend into civil war. The rising death toll, numbering in the thousands, drew international condemnation and resulted in the resignation of several Libyan diplomats, along with calls for the government's dismantlement.

Amidst ongoing efforts by demonstrators and rebel forces to wrest control of Tripoli from the Jamahiriya, the opposition set up an interim government in Benghazi to oppose Colonel Muammar Gaddafi's rule. However, despite initial opposition success, government forces subsequently took back much of the Mediterranean coast.

On 17 March, United Nations Security Council Resolution 1973 was adopted, authorising a no-fly zone over Libya, and "all necessary measures" to protect civilians. Two days later, France, the United States and the United Kingdom intervened in Libya with a bombing campaign against pro-Gaddafi forces. A coalition of 27 states from Europe and the Middle East soon joined the intervention. The forces were driven back from the outskirts of Benghazi, and the rebels mounted an offensive, capturing scores of towns across the coast of Libya. The offensive stalled however, and a counter-offensive by the government retook most of the towns, until a stalemate was formed between Brega and Ajdabiya, the former being held by the government and the latter in the hands of the rebels. Focus then shifted to the west of the country, where bitter fighting continued. After a three-month-long battle, a loyalist siege of rebel-held Misrata, the third largest city in Libya, was broken in large part due to coalition air strikes. The four major fronts of combat were generally considered to be the Nafusa Mountains, the Tripolitanian coast, the Gulf of Sidra, and the southern Libyan Desert.

In late August, anti-Gaddafi fighters captured Tripoli, scattering Gaddafi's government and marking the end of his 42 years of power. Many institutions of the government, including Gaddafi and several top government officials, regrouped in Sirte, which Gaddafi declared to be Libya's new capital. Others fled to Sabha, Bani Walid, and remote reaches of the Libyan Desert, or to surrounding countries. However, Sabha fell in late September, Bani Walid was captured after a grueling siege weeks later, and on 20 October, fighters under the aegis of the National Transitional Council seized Sirte, killing Gaddafi in the process. However, after Gaddafi was killed, the Civil War continued.

Syria (2011) 

Protests in Syria started on 26 January 2011, when a police officer assaulted a man in public at "Al-Hareeka Street" in old Damascus. The man was arrested right after the assault. As a result, protesters called for the freedom of the arrested man. Soon a "day of rage" was set for 4–5 February, but it was uneventful. On 6 March, the Syrian security forces arrested about 15 children in Daraa, in southern Syria, for writing slogans against the government. Soon protests erupted over the arrest and abuse of the children. Daraa was to be the first city to protest against the Ba'athist government, which has been ruling Syria since 1963.

Thousands of protesters gathered in Damascus, Aleppo, al-Hasakah, Daraa, Deir ez-Zor, and Hama on 15 March, with recently released politician Suhair Atassi becoming an unofficial spokesperson for the "Syrian revolution". The next day there were reports of approximately 3000 arrests and a few casualties, but there are no official figures on the number of deaths. On 18 April 2011, approximately 100,000 protesters sat in the central Square of Homs calling for the resignation of President Bashar al-Assad. Protests continued through July 2011, the government responding with harsh security clampdowns and military operations in several districts, especially in the north.

On 31 July, Syrian army tanks stormed several cities, including Hama, Deir Ez-Zour, Abu Kamal, and Herak near Daraa. At least 136 people were killed, the highest death toll in any day since the start of the uprising. On 5 August 2011, an anti-government demonstration took place in Syria called "God is with us", during which the Syrian security forces shot the protesters from inside the ambulances, killing 11 people consequently. The Arab Spring events in Syria subsequently escalated into the Syrian Civil War.

Tunisia (2010–2011) 

Following the self-immolation of Mohamed Bouazizi in Sidi Bouzid, a series of increasingly violent street demonstrations through December 2010 ultimately led to the ousting of longtime President Zine El Abidine Ben Ali on 14 January 2011. The demonstrations were preceded by high unemployment, food inflation, corruption, lack of freedom of speech and other forms of political freedom, and poor living conditions. The protests constituted the most dramatic wave of social and political unrest in Tunisia in three decades and resulted in scores of deaths and injuries, most of which were the result of action by police and security forces against demonstrators. Ben Ali fled into exile in Saudi Arabia, ending his 23 years in power.

A state of emergency was declared and a caretaker coalition government was created following Ben Ali's departure, which included members of Ben Ali's party, the Constitutional Democratic Rally (RCD), as well as opposition figures from other ministries. The five newly appointed non-RCD ministers resigned almost immediately. As a result of continued daily protests, on 27 January Prime Minister Mohamed Ghannouchi reshuffled the government, removing all former RCD members other than himself, and on 6 February the former ruling party was suspended; later, on 9 March, it was dissolved. Following further public protests, Ghannouchi himself resigned on 27 February, and Beji Caid Essebsi became Prime Minister.

On 23 October 2011 Tunisians voted in the first post-revolution election to elect representatives to a 217-member constituent assembly that would be responsible for the new constitution. The leading Islamist party, Ennahda, won 37% of the vote, and elected 42 women to the Constituent Assembly.

On 26 January 2014 a new constitution was adopted. The constitution is seen as progressive, increasing human rights, gender equality, and government duties toward people, laying the groundwork for a new parliamentary system and making Tunisia a decentralized and open government.

On 26 October 2014 Tunisia held its first parliamentary elections since the 2011 Arab Spring and its presidential election on 23 November 2014, finishing its transition to a democratic state. These elections were characterized by a decline in Ennahdha's popularity in favor of the secular Nidaa Tounes party, which became the first party of the country.

United Arab Emirates (2011) 
In the United Arab Emirates, the Arab Spring saw a sudden and intense demand for democratic reforms. However, government repression of human rights, including unlawful detentions and torture, quelled the opposition and silenced dissenters. Even years after the Arab Spring uprisings, the Emirates remain in staunch opposition to free speech.

In 2011, 133 peaceful political activists — including academics and members of a social organization, Islah — signed a petition calling for democratic reforms. Submitted to the Emirati monarch rulers, the petition demanded elections, more legislative powers for the Federal National Council and an independent judiciary.

In 2012, the authorities arrested 94 of the 133 journalists, government officials, judges, lawyers, teachers and student activists, who were detained in secret detention facilities. For a year, until the trial began in March 2013, the 94 prisoners were subjected to enforced disappearances and torture. As the “unfair” trial ended on 2 July 2013, 69 men were convicted on the basis of evidence acquired through forced confessions, and received harsh prison sentences of up to 15 years.

The case came to be known as “UAE-94”, following which freedom of speech was further curbed. For years, these prisoners have been under arbitrary detention, with some “held in incommunicado, and denied their rights”. In July 2021, Amnesty International called the UAE authorities to immediately release 60 prisoners of the UAE-94 case, who remained detained nine years after their arrest.

Following the 2011 petition, the UAE authorities also arrested five prominent human rights defenders and government critics who did not sign the petition. All were pardoned the next day but have been facing a number of unfair acts of the government. One of the prominent Emirati activists, Ahmed Mansoor, reported being beaten twice since then. His passport was confiscated and nearly $140,000 were stolen from his personal bank account. Most of the human rights activists have been victims of the UAE government's intimidation for years.

The authorities also exiled a local man to Thailand. He spoke out about the government.

Yemen (2011) 

Protests occurred in many towns in both the north and south of Yemen starting in mid-January 2011. Demonstrators in the South mainly protested against President Saleh's support of Al Qaeda in South Yemen, the marginalization of the Southern people and the exploitation of Southern natural resources. Other parts of the country initially protested against governmental proposals to modify the constitution of Yemen, unemployment and economic conditions, and corruption, but their demands soon included a call for the resignation of President Ali Abdullah Saleh, who had been facing internal opposition from his closest advisors since 2009.

A major demonstration of over 16,000 protesters took place in Sana'a on 27 January 2011, and soon thereafter human rights activist and politician Tawakel Karman called for a "Day of Rage" on 3 February. According to Xinhua News, organizers were calling for a million protesters. In response to the planned protest, Ali Abdullah Saleh stated that he would not seek another presidential term in 2013.

On 3 February, 20,000 protesters demonstrated against the government in Sana'a, others participated in a "Day of Rage" in Aden that was called for by Tawakel Karman, while soldiers, armed members of the General People's Congress, and many protestors held a pro-government rally in Sana'a. Concurrent with the resignation of Egyptian president Mubarak, Yemenis again took to the streets protesting President Saleh on 11 February, in what has been dubbed a "Friday of Rage". The protests continued in the days following despite clashes with government advocates. In a "Friday of Anger" held on 18 February, tens of thousands of Yemenis took part in anti-government demonstrations in the major cities of Sana'a, Taiz, and Aden. Protests continued over the following months, especially in the three major cities, and briefly intensified in late May into urban warfare between Hashid tribesmen and army defectors allied with the opposition on one side and security forces and militias loyal to Saleh on the other.

After Saleh pretended to accept a Gulf Cooperation Council-brokered plan allowing him to cede power in exchange for immunity from prosecution only to back away before signing three separate times, an assassination attempt on 3 June left him and several other high-ranking Yemeni officials injured by a blast in the presidential compound's mosque. Saleh was evacuated to Saudi Arabia for treatment and handed over power to Vice President Abdrabbuh Mansur Hadi, who largely continued his policies and ordered the arrest of several Yemenis in connection with the attack on the presidential compound. While in Saudi Arabia, Saleh kept hinting that he could return any time and continued to be present in the political sphere through television appearances from Riyadh starting with an address to the Yemeni people on 7 July. On 13 August, a demonstration was announced in Yemen as "Mansouron Friday" in which hundreds of thousands of Yemenis called for Saleh to go. The protesters joining the "Mansouron Friday" were calling for establishment of "a new Yemen". On 12 September Saleh issued a presidential decree while still receiving treatment in Riyadh authorizing Hadi to negotiate a deal with the opposition and sign the GCC initiative.

On 23 September, three months since the assassination attempt, Saleh returned to Yemen abruptly, defying all earlier expectations. Pressure on Saleh to sign the GCC initiative eventually led to his doing so in Riyadh on 23 November. Saleh thereby agreed to step down and set the stage for the transfer of power to his vice president. A presidential election was then held on 21 February 2012, in which Hadi (the only candidate) won 99.8% of the vote. Hadi then took the oath of office in Yemen's parliament on 25 February. By 27 February Saleh had resigned from the presidency and transferred power to Hadi. The replacement government was overthrown by Houthi rebels on 22 January 2015, starting the Yemeni Civil War and the Saudi Arabian-led intervention in Yemen.

Outcomes

Arab Winter 

In the aftermath of the Arab Spring in various countries, there was a wave of violence and instability commonly known as the Arab Winter or Islamist Winter. The Arab Winter was characterized by extensive civil wars, general regional instability, economic and demographic decline of the Arab League and overall religious wars between Sunni and Shia Muslims.

Although the long-term effects of the Arab Spring have yet to be shown, its short-term consequences varied greatly across the Middle East and North Africa. In Tunisia and Egypt, where the existing regimes were ousted and replaced through a process of free and fair election, the revolutions were considered short-term successes. This interpretation is, however, problematized by the subsequent political turmoil that emerged, particularly in Egypt. Elsewhere, most notably in the monarchies of Morocco and the Persian Gulf, existing regimes co-opted the Arab Spring movement and managed to maintain order without significant social change. In other countries, particularly Syria and Libya, the apparent result of Arab Spring protests was a complete societal collapse.

Social scientists have endeavored to understand the circumstances that led to this variation in outcome. A variety of causal factors have been highlighted, most of which hinge on the relationship between the strength of the state and the strength of civil society. Countries with stronger civil society networks in various forms underwent more successful reforms during the Arab Spring; these findings are also consistent with more general social science theories such as those espoused by Robert D. Putnam and Joel S. Migdal.

One of the primary influences that have been highlighted in the analysis of the Arab Spring is the relative strength or weakness of a society's formal and informal institutions prior to the revolts. When the Arab Spring began, Tunisia had an established infrastructure and a lower level of petty corruption than did other states, such as Libya. This meant that, following the overthrow of the existing regime, there was less work to be done in reforming Tunisian institutions than elsewhere, and consequently it was less difficult to transition to and consolidate a democratic system of government.

Also crucial was the degree of state censorship over print, broadcast, and social media in different countries. Television coverage by channels like Al Jazeera and BBC News provided worldwide exposure and prevented mass violence by the Egyptian government in Tahrir Square, contributing to the success of the Egyptian Revolution. In other countries, such as Libya, Bahrain, and Syria, such international press coverage was not present to the same degree, and the governments of these countries were able to act more freely in suppressing the protests. Strong authoritarian regimes with high degrees of censorship in their national broadcast media were able to block communication and prevent the domestic spread of information necessary for successful protests.

Countries with greater access to social media, such as Tunisia and Egypt, proved more effective in mobilizing large groups of people, and appear to have been more successful overall than those with greater state control over media. Although social media played a large role in shaping the events of revolutions social activism did not occur in a vacuum. Without the use of street level organization social activists would not have been as effective. Even though a revolution did take place and the prior government has been replaced, Tunisia's government can not conclude that another uprising will not take place. There are still many grievances taking place today.

Due to tourism coming to a halt and other factors during the revolution and Arab Spring movement, the budget deficit has grown and unemployment has risen since 2011. According to the World Bank in 2016, "Unemployment remains at 15.3% from 16.7% in 2011, but still well above the pre-revolution level of 13%." Large scale emigration brought on by a long and treacherous civil war has permanently harmed the Syrian economy. Projections for economic contraction will remain high at almost 7% in 2017.

Still to this day, in countries affected by the Arab Spring, there is great division amongst those who prefer the status quo and those who want democratic change. As these regions dive ever deeper into political conflict time will show if new ideas can be established or if old institutions will still stand strong. The largest change from the pre-revolution to the post-revolution was in the attempt to break up political elites and reshape the geopolitical structure of the middle east. It is speculated that many of the changes brought on by the Arab Spring will lead to a shifting of regional power in the Middle East and a quickly changing structure of power.

The support, even if tacit, of national military forces during protests has also been correlated to the success of the Arab Spring movement in different countries. In Egypt and Tunisia, the military actively participated in ousting the incumbent regime and in facilitating the transition to democratic elections. Countries like Saudi Arabia, on the other hand, exhibited a strong mobilization of military force against protesters, effectively ending the revolts in their territories; others, including Libya and Syria, failed to stop the protests entirely and instead ended up in civil war. The support of the military in Arab Spring protests has also been linked to the degree of ethnic homogeneity in different societies. In Saudi Arabia and Syria, where the ruling elite was closely linked with ethnic or religious subdivisions of society, the military sided with the existing regime and took on the ostensible role of protector to minority populations. Even aside from the military issue, countries with less homogeneous ethnic and national identities, such as Yemen and Jordan, seem to have exhibited less effective mobilization on the whole. The apparent exception to this trend is Egypt, which has a sizable Coptic minority.

The presence of a strong, educated middle class has been noted as a correlate to the success of the Arab Spring in different countries. Countries with strong welfare programs and a weak middle class, such as Saudi Arabia and Jordan, as well as countries with great economic disparity and an impoverished working class—including Yemen, Libya, and Morocco—did not experience successful revolutions. The strength of the middle class is, in turn, directly connected to the existing political, economic, and educational institutions in a country, and the middle class itself may be considered an informal institution. In very broad terms, this may be reframed in terms of development, as measured by various indicators such as the Human Development Index: rentier states such as the oil monarchies of the Persian Gulf exhibited less successful revolutions overall.

Charting what he calls the 'new masses' of the twenty-first century, Sociologist Göran Therborn draws attention to the historical contradictory role of the middle class. The Egyptian middle class has illustrated this ambivalence and contradiction in 2011 and 2013: "The volatility of middle-class politics is vividly illustrated by the sharp turns in Egypt, from acclamation of democracy to adulation of the military and its mounting repression of dissent, effectively condoning the restoration of the ancien régime minus Mubarak.

Long-term aftermath

Sectarianism and collapse of state systems 

Some trends in political Islam resulting from the Arab Spring noted by observers (Quinn Mecham and Tarek Osman) include:
Repression of the Muslim Brotherhood, not only in Egypt by the military and courts following the forcible removal of Morsi from office in 2013; but also by Saudi Arabia and a number of Gulf countries (not Qatar). The ambassadors crisis also seriously threatened the GCC's activities, adversely affected its functioning and could arguably even have led to its dissolution.
Rise of Islamist "state-building" where "state failure" has taken place—most prominently in Syria, Iraq, Libya and Yemen. Islamists have found it easier than competing non-Islamists trying to fill the void of state failure, by securing external funding, weaponry and fighters – "many of which have come from abroad and have rallied around a pan-Islamic identity". The norms of governance in these Islamist areas are militia-based, and the governed submit to their authority out of fear, loyalty, other reasons, or some combination. The "most expansive" of these new "models" is the Islamic State.
Increasing sectarianism (primarily Sunni-Shia) at least in part from proxy wars and the escalation of the Iran–Saudi Arabia proxy conflict. Islamists are fighting Islamists across sectarian lines in Lebanon (Sunni militants targeting Hezbollah positions), Yemen (between mainstream Sunni Islamists of al-Islah and the Shiite Zaydi Houthi movement), in Iraq (Islamic State and Iraqi Shiite militias).
Increased caution and political learning in countries such as Algeria and Jordan where Islamists have chosen not to lead a major challenge against their governments. In Yemen, al-Islah "has sought to frame its ideology in a way that will avoid charges of militancy".
In countries where Islamists did choose to lead a major challenge and did not succeed in transforming society (particularly Egypt), a disinterest in "soul-searching" about what went wrong, in favor of "antagonism and fiery anger" and a thirst for revenge. Partisans of political Islam (although this does not include some prominent leaders such as Rached Ghannouchi but is particularly true in Egypt) see themselves as victims of an injustice whose perpetrators are not just "individual conspirators but entire social groups".
"The repercussions of the 2011 uprisings have influenced Middle Eastern youth's experiences providing impetus for questioning perennial sacred beliefs and positions, and forging ahead avant-garde views and responses to the constraints they face."

Contrary to the common discourse, Hussein Agha and Robert Malley from The New Yorker argue that the divide in the post-Arab Spring in the Middle East is not sectarianism:

Agha and Malley point out that even in Syria there has been a misrepresentation of the conflict, that the Assad regime relied on an alliance that included middle class Sunnis along with other religious minorities. Prior to the uprising, the Syrian regime enjoyed some financial and political support from Sunni Gulf states. The "select rich urban bourgeoisie, the Sunni Damascene in particular", according to Tokyo University researcher Housam Darwisheh, "now has a direct interest in preserving stability and their relations with the regime as long as their businesses prosper." In the view of the Arab sociologist Halim Barakat, "the persistence of communal cleavages complicates rather than nullifies social class consciousness and struggles."

Arab Summer (Second Arab Spring)

Arab Spring: Revolution or reform 
Very few analysts of the Arab societies foresaw a mass movement on such a scale that might threaten the existing order. In his 1993 sociological study of the Arab societies, culture and state, Barakat stated confidently that "one should expect the first Arab popular revolution to take place in Egypt or Tunisia. This does not, however, exclude the possibility that revolutions may occur in more pluralistic societies as well." What was prevalent, according to the Syrian writer and political dissident Yassin al-Haj Saleh was three 'springs' that ensured the status quo. One of which was a "spring of despotic states that receive assistance and legitimacy from a world system centered around stability". Most democracy protests do not result in reforms.

Two months into the Tunisian and Egyptian uprisings, The Economist magazine in a leader article spoke about a new generation of young people, idealists, "inspired by democracy", which made revolutions. Those revolutions, the article stated, "are going the right way, with a hopeful new mood prevailing and free elections in the offing". For those on the streets of Egypt the predominant slogan was "bread, freedom and social justice".

Some observers, however, have questioned the revolutionary nature of the 'Arab Spring'. A social theorist specialising in social movements and social change in the Middle East, Asef Bayat, has provided an analysis based on his decades-long of research as "a participant-observer" (in his own words). In his appraisal of the Arab revolutions, Bayat discerns a remarkable difference between these revolutions and the revolutions of the 1960s and 1970s in countries like Yemen, Nicaragua and Iran. The Arab revolutions, argues Bayat, "lacked any associated intellectual anchor" and the predominant voices, "secular and Islamists alike, took free market, property relations, and neoliberal rationality for granted" and uncritically. New social movements' define themselves as horizontal networks with aversion to the state and central authority. Thus their "political objective is not to capture the state", a fundamental feature in the twentieth-century revolutionary movements. Instead of revolution or reform, Bayat speaks of 'refolution'.

Wael Ghonim, an Internet activist who would later gain an international fame, acknowledged that what he had intended by founding a Facebook page was a "simple reaction to the events in Tunisia" and that "there was no master plans or strategies" a priori. That the objective was reform to be achieved through peaceful means and not revolution was explicitly put forward by April 6 Movement, one of the leading forces of the Egyptian uprising, in their statements. It called for "coalition and co-operation between all factions and national forces to reach the reform and the peaceful change of the conditions of Egypt". "Even in Tahrir Square with so many people and the rising level of demands," recalls an activist in the movement, "we were very surprised by the people wanting the downfall of the regime; and not a single one of us had expected this." In comparing the uprisings in Tunisia, Egypt, Libya and Syria, researcher Housam Darwisheh concludes: "The Egyptian uprising, in neither dismantling the ancien regime nor creating new institutional mechanisms to lead the transition, permitted the so-called 'deep state' to reassert itself while the deepening polarization led many non-Islamists to side with the military against the MB [the Muslim Brotherhood]."

According to Cambridge sociologist Hazem Kandil, the Muslim Brotherhood did not aim at taking power during the events leading up to the toppling of Mubarak. The biggest and most organised organisation in Egypt in fact negotiated with the regime in "infamous talks between Morsi and the then vice-president Omar Suleiman", and "an informal deal was reached: withdraw your members from Tahrir Square, and we allow you to form a political party." Then the Brotherhood wavered whether to file a presidential candidate and did not push for a new constitution, choosing to work with the Supreme Council of the Armed Forces (SCAF):

George Lawson from the London School of Economics places the Arab uprisings within the post-Cold War world. He characterises the uprisings as "largely unsuccessful revolution" and that they "bare a family resemblance to the 'negotiated revolutions'... Negotiated revolutions ... seek to transform political and symbolic fields of action, but without a concomitant commitment to a program of economic transformation." In this 'negotiated revolution', comments Bayat, "revolutionaries had in effect little part in the 'negotiations'." What has been treated by some analysts as intellectual weakness of the revolutionary movement is partly due to the pre-2011 stifling cultural environment under repressive regimes. Although Egyptian intellectuals enjoyed a bigger margin of freedom than their counterparts in Tunisia, cultural figures sought protection from political players, and instead of leading criticism, they complied.

The post-Cold War era saw the emergence of the idea and practice of gradual reform and liberal agenda. It saw an influx of humanitarian projects, NGOs and charity work, liberal think tanks and emphasis on civil society work. This new juncture seemed to have made the idea and prospect of revolution an outdated project. The focus instead shifted to individual freedoms and free market. The new idea of civil society was different from the kind of civil society Antonio Gramsci, for instance, envisaged: 'a revolution before the revolution'.

In her field study in Yemen, anthropologist Bogumila Hall depicts the effects of what she terms as "the marketization of civil society and its heavy reliance on donors", which "led to a largely depoliticized form of activism that by passed, rather than confronted, the state". Hall, with her focus on the muhammashīn (the marginalized) in Yemen, described how in the 1990s and 2000s international NGOs established charity projects and workshops "to teach slum dwellers new skills and behaviours". But, besides the "modest changes" brought by the NGOs, concludes Hall, "delegating the problem of the muhammashīn to the realm of development and poverty alleviation, without addressing the structural causes underlying their marginalisation, had a depoliticising effect. It led to a widely held assumption, also shared by the muhammashīn, that ending marginalisation was a matter for experts and administrative measures, not politics."

When Arab regimes viewed NGOs' leaders and other similar organisations with suspicion, accusing Western governments of providing funding and training to 'illegal organisations' and fomenting revolution, diplomatic cables reported "how American officials frequently assured skeptical governments that the training was aimed at reform, not promoting revolutions". And when the Egyptian uprising was gaining its momentum, the American president Barack Obama "did not suggest that the 82-year-old leader step aside or transfer power... the argument was that he really needed to do the reforms, and do them fast. Former ambassador to Egypt (Frank G.) Wisner publicly suggested that Mr. Mubarak had to be at the center of any change, and Secretary of State Hillary Rodham Clinton warned that any transition would take time." Some activists, who read the American thinker and nonviolence advocate Gene Sharp, obtained training from foreign bodies, including the Serbian opposition movement Otpor!, and April 6 Movement modelled its logo after Otpor's. Otpor, writes Bayat in his discussion of the agencies of the Arab Spring activism in Tunisia and Egypt, obtained funds from well-known American organisations such as the American National Endowment for Democracy, USAID, and the International Republican Institute. Thus Otpur, in line with these organisations' advocacies, "pushed for political reform through nonradical, electoral, and market-driven language and practices".

Early 2019 witnessed two uprisings: one in Algeria and another in Sudan. In Algeria under pressure of weeks of protests, the head of the army forced the ailing twenty-year-serving president, Abdelaziz Bouteflika, to abdicate. In Sudan, after four months of protests, the Sudani defense minister ousted longtime President Omar al-Bashir in a coup. Writing about what he calls "a rebirth of Tahrir Square", the prominent Lebanese novelist and critic Elias Khoury, averred that "perhaps the secret of the Arab Spring lies not in its victories or defeats, but in its ability to liberate people from fear." Despite the "faded spirit of Tahrir Square" and an outcome that Khoury describes as a "monarchy that abrogates legal standards", a renaissance of resistance is unstoppable:

There was a need, suggested Khoury, to turn "the uprisings of the Arab Spring into an intellectual, political and moral project that gives meaning to the goals of freedom, democracy and social justice". From the outset the 2011 Arab uprisings raised the banner of 'social justice'. The concept, what it means and how to achieve it has been a major subject of discussion and contention since then.

Social justice 
In its economic and social manifesto, the Tunisian Ennahda Movement states that the movement "adopts the social and solidarised market economy within a national approach based on free economic activity, freedom of ownership, production and administration on the one hand, and social justice and equal opportunities on the other hand" and that "national capital has to be the axis in the development process." The Muslim Brotherhood in Egypt mainly focuses on "reform of existing political systems in the Arab world. It embraces the idea of political activism and social responsibility, organising charitable works and social support programmes as part of its outreach to its core support base of lower-income populations."

On its part the International Centre for Transitional Justice has set nine 'concrete and tangible' goals with focus on "accountability for serious violations of human rights, access to justice, facilitating peace processes, advancing the cause of reconciliation and reforming the state and social institutions". One of those goals was taken up by Truth and Dignity Commission (Tunisia) that recorded and submitted to the relevant court the human rights abuses which had been committed by the Tunisian regime. A new climate of freedom of speech, freedom of organisation and elections characterised the political environment of post-Ben Ali Tunisia.

Some observers and social analysts remarked, however, that the issue of social justice remained a rhetoric or was marginalised. According to Fathi Al-Shamikhi, an expert in debt issues and founder of the Tunisian association RAID, different social forces played a crucial role in matters related to social demands and achieving social justice. "This role varies between those who advocate these demands and those who reject them, according to the social nature of each of these forces."
"Bread, freedom and social justice" were the main slogans of the Arab revolutions. But although social and economic demands were raised, argued researcher and former editor in chief of the Egyptian Al-Shorouq Newspaper, Wael Gamal, "they were pushed aside in the political arena, and more attention was given to issues such as the transfer of power arrangements, the constitution first, the elections first, democratic transformation and the religious-secular conflict."

Counter-revolution and civil wars 
With the survival of the regime in Egypt and the rolling back of what was gained in the short period after the overthrow of Mubarak, the persistence, or even the worsening, of the socio-economic conditions that led to the Tunisian uprising, a Saudi-led intervention in Bahrain assisted the defeat of the uprising in the country, and especially the descent of other uprisings into brutal civil wars in Syria, Libya and Yemen, with acute humanitarian crises, there are

Writing in April 2019, amidst an offensive to take Libya's capital Tripoli by Khalifa Haftar who gained the backing of the U.S. president Donald Trump, Marwan Kabalan argued that "counter-revolutionary forces are seeking to resurrect the military dictatorship model the Arab Spring dismantled." Kapalan contended that "regional and world powers have sponsored the return of military dictatorships to the region, with the hope that they would clean up the Arab Spring 'mess' and restore order." He also referred to Western powers' history of backing military rule in the region, and how American interests in the Middle East clashed with French but mainly with British ones, citing the American supported coups in Syria and Egypt, but generally how, as former US Secretary of State Condoleezza Rice admitted, the United States "pursued stability at the expense of democracy... and achieved neither". Kabalan concluded:

Analyst H. A. Hellyer attributes the persistence of autocracy and dictatorship, as well as counter-revolution, to structures that go back to colonialism. But also to the forms the states in the MENA region took in the postcolonial era and the social pacts that were established in the process. What we are seeing today since 2011, argues Hellyer, is a clash between those "inherited structures" and the new "demographic realities" of the populations of the region.

Compromise and dialogue with the entrenched regimes, followed by elections in Tunisia and Egypt have produced either limited change or counter-revolution. In the first quarter of 2019 protests and mass mobilisation in Sudan and Algeria succeeded in toppling the head of states, but it seems there is a dilemma, argues scholar and fellow at Woodrow Wilson Center Marina Ottaway. The demands of the genuine grassroots movements are unlikely, unfortunately, "to be attained through a peaceful process – one without violence and the violation of the human rights of many". Ottaway points out to the experiences of Algeria and Egypt when in the former the regime annulled the results of the elections in the early 1990s and in the latter when the military carried out a bloody repression of the Muslim Brotherhood government during the 2013 coup.

Space and the city in the Arab uprisings 

For contemporary activists, protesting in Tahrir Square in the last decade always meant "a battle to control the space, especially under an authoritarian regime and heavy police state". In an environment where people distrust formal politics, they find the streets almost the only space available to them to express their grievances, discontent and solidarity. As sociologist Bayat puts it, urban streets are not only a physical place for "street politics", but they also "signify a different but crucial symbolic utterance, one that transcends the physicality of street, to convey collective sentiments of a nation or a community". Researcher Atef Said makes a connection between previous events that took place in Tahrir and the 2011 occupation of the Square. "Spaces," writes Said, "carry meanings that are constructed over time, redeployed and reconfigured in the present, and carried forward as inspiration for the future."

In a survey conducted by the National Center for Social and Criminological Research in Egypt, and its results published by the daily al-Masry al-Youm, just a week before the beginning of the uprising, the sample of 2,956 people expressed that achieving justice and political stability, lowering prices, having access to clean drinking water, and providing comfortable transportation topped the list of changes they desired for their country.

By country
  Jasmine revolution
  2010–2012 Algerian protests
  2011–2013 Sudanese protests
  2011 Omani protests
  Yemeni Revolution
  2011–2012 Jordanian protests
  Egyptian Crisis (2011–2014)
  Syrian civil war
  2011–2012 Moroccan protests
  2011 Iraqi protests
  2011 Bahraini uprising
  Kuwaiti protests (2011–2012)
  First Libyan Civil War

See also

References

Further reading 

 Aa. Vv. (2011), The New Arab Revolt: What Happened, What It Means, and What Comes Next, Council on Foreign Relations, Foreign Affairs, Maggio-Giugno.

 Abaza, M. (2011), Revolutionary Moments in Tahrir Square, American University of Cairo, 7 May 2011, www.isa-sociology.org.
 Abdih, Y. (2011), Arab Spring: Closing the Jobs Gap. High youth unemployment contributes to widespread unrest in the Middle East Finance & Development, in Finance & Development (International Monetary Fund), Giugno.
 Alfadhel, Khalifa. The Failure of the Arab Spring (Cambridge Scholars Publishing, 2016). 
 
 Beinin, J. – Vairel, F. (2011), (a cura di), Social Movements, Mobilization, and Contestation in the Middle East and North Africa, Stanford, CA, Stanford University press.
 
 
 Cohen, R. (2011), A Republic Called Tahrir, in New York Times.
 Dabashi, Hamid. The Arab Spring: The End of Postcolonialism (Palgrave Macmillan; 2012) 182 pages
 
 
 
 Gause, F. G. (2011), Why Middle East Studies Missed the Arab Spring: The Myth of Authoritarian Stability, in Foreign Affairs, July/August.
 
 
 
 Krüger, Laura-Theresa, and Bernhard Stahl. "The French foreign policy U-turn in the Arab Spring–the case of Tunisia." Mediterranean Politics 23.2 (2018): 197–222 online.
 Lutterbeck, Derek. (2013). Arab Uprisings, Armed Forces, and Civil-Military Relations. Armed Forces & Society, Vol. 39, No. 1 (pp. 28–52)
 
 
 
 
Roberts, Adam, Michael J. Willis, Rory McCarthy and Timothy Garton Ash (eds.), Civil Resistance in the Arab Spring: Triumphs and Disasters, Oxford University Press, Oxford, 2016. . Arabic language edition published by All Prints Publishers, Beirut, 2017. .
 Rosiny, S. and Richter, T. (2016). "The Arab Spring: Misconceptions and Prospects". GIGA Focus Middle East No. 4/2016
 Steinitz, Chris and McCants, William (2014). Reaping the Whirlwind: Gulf State Competition after the Arab Uprisings. Arlington, VA: CNA Corporation.
 

 United States. Congress. Senate. Committee on Foreign Relations. Subcommittee on International Operations and Organizations, Human Rights, Democracy, and Global Women's Issues. (2012). Women and the Arab Spring: Joint Hearing before the Subcommittee on International Operations and Organizations, Human Rights, Democracy, and Global Women's Issues and the Subcommittee on Near Eastern and South and Central Asian Affairs of the Committee on Foreign Relations, United States Senate, One Hundred Twelfth Congress, First Session, November 2, 2011. Washington, D.C.: U.S. G.P.O.

External links

Arab Spring
Right to Nonviolence
United States Institute of Peace
Civil Movements: The Impact of Facebook and Twitter
Middle East Constitutional Forum

Live blogs
Middle East at Al Jazeera
Middle East protests at BBC News
Arab and Middle East protests live blog at The Guardian
Middle East Protests at The Lede blog at The New York Times
Middle East protests live at Reuters

Ongoing coverage
A (Working) Academic Arab Spring Reading List collected peer-reviewed academic articles on the impact of social media on the Arab Spring
Constitutional Transitions Timeline Collected legal and political changes and short analysis at Middle East Constitutional Forum
Unrest in the Arab World collected news and commentary at Carnegie Endowment for International Peace
Issue Guide: Arab World Protests, Council on Foreign Relations
Middle East protests collected news and commentary at the Financial Times
Unrest in the Arab World collected map, news and commentary at CNN

Rage on the Streets collected news and commentary at Hurriyet Daily News and Economic Review
Middle East Unrest collected news and commentary at The National
Middle East Uprisings collected news and commentary at Showdown in the Middle East website

The Middle East in Revolt collected news and commentary at Time

Other

The Arab Spring—One Year Later: The CenSEI Report analyzes how 2011's clamor for democratic reform met 2012's need to sustain its momentum. The CenSEI Report, 13 February 2012
Interface journal special issue on the Arab Spring, Interface: A Journal for and about Social Movements, May 2012

Sadek J. Al Azm, "The Arab Spring: Why Exactly at this Time?" Reason Papers 33 (Fall 2011)
Tracking the wave of protests with statistics, RevolutionTrends.org
Arab uprisings: 10 key moments from BBC Middle East Editor Jeremy Bowden (10 December 2012)
 How to Start a Revolution, documentary directed by Ruaridh Arrow

Arab Spring
2010 in Africa
2011 in Africa
2012 in Africa
2010 in Asia
2011 in Asia
2012 in Asia
2010 protests
2011 protests
2012 protests
2010s coups d'état and coup attempts
21st-century revolutions
Protest marches
Revolutionary waves
Intifadas
Internet censorship
Spring
History of North Africa
History of the Middle East